The Russian submarine AG-22 was an AG-class  submarine, designed by the American Holland Torpedo Boat Company/Electric Boat Company, built for the Imperial Russian Navy during World War I. The submarine was fabricated in Canada, shipped to Russia and reassembled for service with the Black Sea Fleet. Her reassembly was completed in 1919 by the White Movement during the Russian Civil War, and she joined Wrangel's fleet as it evacuated the Crimea in 1920 and was interned in Bizerte, Tunisia in 1921. AG-22 was abandoned there and subsequently scrapped.

Description
AG-22 was a single-hulled submarine, with a pressure hull divided into five watertight compartments. She displaced  on the surface and  submerged.

The submarine had two three-bladed propellers, each of which was driven by a  diesel engine as well as a  electric motors. This arrangement gave AG-22 a maximum speed of  while surfaced and  submerged.

The AG-class submarines were equipped with four  torpedo tubes in the bow and carried eight torpedoes. For surface combat they had one  deck gun.

Construction and service
The Holland 602 design was widely exported during World War I and the Imperial Russian Navy ordered a total of 17, in three batches, of a version known as the American Holland-class (AG in Russian for Amerikansky Golland (American Holland)). The submarines were to be built in Canada as knock-down kits for assembly in Russia.

Steel for the first three submarines (AG-22, and ) of the second batch ordered by the Russians was assembled in Saint John, New Brunswick by May 1916. Five months later, they were sent to Vancouver by rail in sections where they were loaded into ships and shipped to Vladivostok. There they were loaded onto the Trans-Siberian Railroad and transported to Nikolaev where they were assembled by the Russud Shipyard. Assembly was delayed by the unrest caused by the Russian Revolution and the subsequent Russian Civil War and was not completed until 1919. By this time, Nikolaev was controlled by the Whites and they took AG-22 with them when they evacuated the Crimea in late 1920 as part of what came to be called Wrangel's Fleet. They ultimately were granted asylum in Bizerte in February 1921. AG-22 was abandoned there in November 1923 and subsequently scrapped.

Notes

Bibliography 

 

American Holland-class submarines
Ships built in New Brunswick

Ships built in Russia
1919 ships
World War I submarines of Russia